Richardson Avenue School is located in Swedesboro, Gloucester County, New Jersey, United States. The school was built in 1931 and was added to the National Register of Historic Places on June 18, 1998.

See also
National Register of Historic Places listings in Gloucester County, New Jersey

References

School buildings completed in 1931
School buildings on the National Register of Historic Places in New Jersey
Schools in Gloucester County, New Jersey
Former school buildings in the United States
Defunct schools in New Jersey
National Register of Historic Places in Gloucester County, New Jersey
New Jersey Register of Historic Places
Swedesboro, New Jersey